Maurice Vaute (27 April 1913 – 21 June 2000) was a Belgian composer of classical music, conductor and music teacher.

Biography

Maurice Vaute was born on 27 April 1913 in Roisin and studied at the Conservatories of Mons and Brussels (harmony, fugue, saxophone, etc.). He was a music teacher and, also orchestra and choir conductor.
His compositions are deposited as "Fonds Maurice Vaute" in the library of the Brussels conservatory.
He died in Chimay.

Style
Initially, he was influenced by Maurice Ravel, Claude Debussy, and Joseph Jongen, his teacher. Later, his compositions were atonal.

Compositions

Symphonic works
Auprès de toi - aria, 1936
Arlequins-fantaisie
Gavotte ancienne
Menuetto allegretto
Triptyque for strings and harpsichord
Deux mouvements pour les temps venus
Trinôme for orchestra, soli and wind trio
Concerto for saxophone alto and orchestra
Symphonie de danses for orchestra and saxophone trio
Espace, intensité (symphonie libre)
Les heures, Trois mouvements symphoniques 1. Prélude 2. Rondo giocoso 3. Postlude
Concerto for piano and orchestra
Concerto for violin and orchestra
Rondo pastoral

Ballet
Le reflet dans la Meuse (argument de Malfère)
Melos

Solo instruments
Lied for cello and piano, Souvenance
Moderato allegro for trumpet and piano
Aube, for clarinet and piano (lied) or string quartet
Improvisata for saxophone alto and piano
Cantilène variée for saxophone alto and piano (Editions Maurer Bruxelles)
Divertissement à quatre voix for trumpets
Invention 84 for violin and piano

Piano
Scherzo
Rondo amabile
Cinq minutes contemplatives, Première suite,(Ed. Armiane, Versailles)
Deuxième suite (Vieille chanson, Danse naïve (Ed. Armiane, Versailles), Mélopée)
Troisième suite (Ed. Maurer, Bruxelles)
Sonatine
Cadence, Distique, Epigramme
Moto perpetuo
Offrande for organ or piano (Ed. Armiane, Versailles)
La complainte de l'agneau
Menuet

Orchestra and choral works
Fantaisie sur une chanson de colin Muset (Moyen-âge)
Chanson des brises (Bouilhet, French poet 1823-1869)

Chamber music
Impromptu for double wind quartet
Wind quintet and piano on a Russian theme
Impromptu for saxophone quartet
Quatre inventions à trois voix for flute, clarinet and bassoon
Choral et divertissement for saxophone quartet
String quartet "Stances d'aujourd'hui"
Third saxophone quartet "Nocturne (Ed. Maurer Bruxelles), Aubade, Allegretto nobile"
Dinanderie for saxophone alto, soli, flute, clarinet, violin, cello, piano, arrangement for two pianos

Choir
Barque d' or (4 voix d'hommes), poem by Van Lerberghe
Les fleurs (4 voix mixtes), poem by Ovide Dieu
Les trois arbres au bout du monde (4 voix mixtes and piano), poem translated from iroquoian by E. Lambotte
Le long du quai (4 voix mixtes), poem by Sully Prudhomme
Cantique (4 voix mixtes and piano), poem by Emile Verhaeren
Psychanalyse (4 voix mixtes), poem by Constant de Horion
Paysage (4 voix mixtes), poem by Simone Simon
Chant deuxième du "Sacre" poem by Charles Plisnier
Le pêcheur de lune (4 voix mixtes), poem by S. Bodard
Chanson (4 voix mixtes et clavecin), poem by Charles d' Orléans
Le joli mai (4 voix mixtes et piano), poem by Valère Gilles
Villanelle (4 voix mixtes et piano), poem by M. Hemon
Voici la maison douce (4 voix mixtes et piano), Les heures du soir, poem by Emile Verhaeren
L'enfant devant la mer (4 voix de femmes, string orchestra and English horn), poem by Elise Vaute-Croix
Cinq chansons à 4 voix mixtes, atonal (poems by Maeterlinck, Carême, Druet, Verhaeren en Libbrecht
Six chants à 2 et 3 voix (poems by Carême, Ley, Simon)
Quatre "Noëls Wallons"
Six chants à 2 et 3 voix for secondary schools
Et les blés (4 voix mixtes), poem by Druet
Fables et chansonnettes pour jeunes (text by Ki Wist alias Jacques Henriquez)
Poésies d'enfants (4 voix mixtes), atonal

Lieder (voice and piano)
La lune blanche, poem by Verlaine
Spleen, poem by Marguerite Denée
Chanson triste, poem by J.M.Deronchène
Intimité, poem by Denise Malray-Ticx
J'ai perdu ma peine, poem by Simone Simon
Prière, poem Suzette Bodard
Aix-en-Provence, poem by Georges Jean Bartel
Instants, poem by Denise Malray-Ticx
Hommes de tous pays, poem by Laure Rolland
Le démon des orages, poem by Jean-Louis Vanham
Partage, poem by Vanham (atonal)
Ciel gris, ciel noir, poem by Maurice Carême
Testament, poem by Lisa Chastelet
Le petit âne gris, poem by Louis Lecomte (atonal)
Le petit frère, text by Madeleine Ley
Les parfums roux, poemby  Vanham (atonal)
Dis-moi qui c'est, poem by Ki Wist, alias Jacques Henriquez
Chant de Noël, from Les chansons et les heures de Marie-Noël

Music theory
21 morceaux de solfège à 5 clés (voice and piano)

Harmony and fanfare
Auprès de toi - aria for fanfare
Entracte commémoratif - Marche de concert for fanfare
Poème pastoral, (arr. for harmony and solo horn)
Prélude en rondo voor fanfare
Pavane pour le teddy - fantasy for fanfare of harmony
Pour un anniversaire - Marche de concert for fanfare and harmony
Menuetto allegretto for fanfare and harmony
Danse des villageois - uittreksel from ballet "Le reflet dans la Meuse" for harmony and fanfare

Light music
Saxophone alto and piano (Ed. Buyst, Bruxelles)
Two soli: Parfum d'une rose and Atlantic
Jenny
Pseudonym: Jean Morivaut 
Toute belle, piano and accordion
Belle promenade, piano and accordion
Sans souci
Simple histoire, Fox trott
Comprendras-tu, slow fox

Bibliography
Thierry Levaux, Dictionnaire des compositeurs de Belgique, Editions Art in Belgium, Conseil de la musique de la Communauté française, 2004, 
Rik Decan, Qui est qui en Belgique francophone, éditions BRD, Bruxelles, 1981, 
Fonds Maurice Vaute, Bibliothèque du Conservatoire royal de Bruxelles.

External links
 Maurice Vaute bij de BNF
 Website over Maurice Vaute
 (Library of the Conservatoire royal de Bruxelles, Belgium)

Belgian classical composers
Belgian male classical composers
20th-century classical composers
1913 births
2000 deaths
20th-century Belgian male musicians